Alcatel–Lucent S.A. was a multinational telecommunications equipment company, headquartered in Boulogne-Billancourt, France. It was formed in 2006 by the merger of France-based Alcatel and U.S.-based Lucent, the latter being a successor of AT&T's Western Electric and Bell Labs.

In 2014, the Alcatel-Lucent group split into two: Alcatel-Lucent Enterprise, providing enterprise communication services, and Alcatel-Lucent, selling to communications operators. The enterprise business was sold to a Chinese company in the same year, and in 2016 Nokia purchased the rest of Alcatel-Lucent.

The company focused on fixed, mobile and converged networking hardware, IP technologies, software and services, with operations in more than 130 countries. In 2014,  it had been named Industry Group Leader for Technology Hardware & Equipment sector in Dow Jones Sustainability Indices review, and listed in the 2014 Thomson Reuters Top 100 Global Innovators for the 4th consecutive year. Alcatel-Lucent also owned Bell Laboratories, one of the largest research and development facilities in the communications industry, whose employees have been awarded nine Nobel Prizes and the company holds in excess of 29,000 patents.

On 3 November 2016, Nokia completed the acquisition of the company and it was merged into their Nokia Networks division. Bell Labs was maintained as an independent subsidiary of Nokia.

The Alcatel-Lucent brand has been retired by Nokia, but it survives in the form of Alcatel-Lucent Enterprise, the enterprise division of Alcatel-Lucent that was sold to China Huaxin in 2014.

History

Alcatel-Lucent was formed when Alcatel (originally short for the Société Alsacienne de Constructions Atomiques, de Télécommunications et d'Électronique, a small company in Mulhouse absorbed by CGE in 1966) merged with Lucent Technologies on 1 December 2006. However, the predecessors of the company have been a part of telecommunications industry since the late 19th century. The company has roots in two early telecommunications companies: La Compagnie Générale d'Electricité (CGE) and the Western Electric Manufacturing Company.

Western Electric began in 1869 when Elisha Gray and Enos N. Barton started a manufacturing firm based in Cleveland, Ohio, US. By 1880, the company had relocated to Chicago, Illinois, and become the largest electrical manufacturing company in the United States. In 1881, the American Bell Telephone Company, founded by Alexander Graham Bell and forerunner of American Telephone & Telegraph (AT&T), purchased a controlling interest in Western Electric and made it the exclusive developer and manufacturer of equipment for the Bell telephone companies.

CGE was formed in 1898 by French engineer Pierre Azaria in the Alsace region of what was then Germany and was a conglomerate involved in industries such as electricity, transportation, electronics and telecommunications. CGE would become a leader in digital communications and would also be known for building the TGV (train à grande vitesse) high-speed trains in France.

Bell Telephone Laboratories was created in 1925 from the consolidation of the R&D organizations of Western Electric and AT&T. Bell Labs would make significant scientific advances including: the transistor, the laser, the solar cell, the digital signal processor chip, the Unix operating system and the cellular concept of mobile telephone service. Bell Labs researchers have won 7 Nobel Prizes.

Also in 1925, Western Electric sold its International Western Electric Company subsidiary to ITT Corporation. CGE purchased the telecommunications part of ITT in the mid-1980s.

AT&T re-entered the European telecommunications market in 1984 following the Bell System divestiture. Philips promoted the venture in part because its PRX public switching technology was ageing and it sought a partner to help fund the development costs of digital switching. The joint company used the existing manufacturing and development facilities in The Hague, Hilversum, Brussels and Malmesbury as well as its U.S. resources to adapt the 5ESS system to the European market. The joint venture company AT&T & Philips Telecommunications BV doubled annual turnover between 1984 and 1987, winning major switching and transmission contracts, mainly in the effectively captive Netherlands market. In 1987, AT&T increased its holding to 60% and in 1990 it purchased the remainder of the Philips' holding.

In 1998, Alcatel Alsthom shifted its focus to the telecommunications industry, spinning off its Alsthom activities and changing the company's name to Alcatel. AT&T spun off Lucent Technologies in April 1996 with an initial public offering (IPO).

In April 2004, TCL Corporation and Alcatel announced the creation of a mobile phone manufacturing joint venture: Alcatel Mobile Phones. A year later Alcatel sold its share in the joint venture but licensed the Alcatel brand name to TCL, which continues to this day under Nokia.

Merger
Facing intense competition in the telecommunications industry, Alcatel and Lucent Technologies merged on 30 November 2006.

On 5 April 2006, Alcatel announced that it would swap its shares of Alcatel Alenia Space and Telespazio for €673 million and a 12.1% stake in Thales, a key player in the French defence industry. This increased Alcatel's stake in Thales to 20.8%.

Alcatel-Lucent acquired Nortel's UMTS radio access business at the end of 2006. During 2007 the company acquired Canadian metro WDM networking supplier Tropic Networks, Inc.; enterprise services gateway products developer NetDevices; IPTV software company Tamblin; and the telecommunications consulting practice Thompson Advisory Group, Inc. Alcatel-Lucent had a joint venture with Dutch company Draka Holding N.V. for manufacturing optical fibre, but Draka bought out Alcatel-Lucent's 49.9% stake for €209 million in December 2007. Motive, Inc., a Texas-based provider of service management software for broadband and mobile data services, was acquired in 2008.

Ben Verwaayen was appointed as chief executive officer in September 2008 after Alcatel-Lucent's first CEO, Patricia Russo, and first chairman, Serge Tchuruk, resigned. In May 2009, Alcatel-Lucent's stake in Thales was acquired by Dassault Aviation. Alcatel-Lucent announced the acquisition of OpenPlug on 1 September 2010.

For 2010, the company had revenues of €16 billion and a reported net loss of €334 million.

In October 2011, Alcatel-Lucent sold its Genesys call-centre services business unit to Permira, a private equity group, for $1.5 billion—the same amount that Lucent had paid for the business in 2000. Alcatel-Lucent needed funding for the Franco-American business, which made annual losses from 2007 to 2011.

For 2011, revenues were €15 billion with a net loss of €1.1 billion. For 2012, revenues were €14.4 billion and the net loss €1.4 billion. After seven consecutive years of negative cash flows, in October 2013 the company announced plans to cut 10,000 employees, 14% of the 72,000 workforce, as part of a €1 billion cost reduction effort.

In April 2013, Michel Combes succeeded Verwaayen as CEO. On 19 June 2013, Combes announced "The Shift Plan", a three-year plan including refocusing the portfolio on IP networking, ultra-broadband access and cloud; €1 billion in cost savings; selective asset sales intended to generate at least €1 billion over the period of the plan; and the restructuring of the group's debt.

On 1 October 2014, the company announced that it had closed the sale of its subsidiary Alcatel-Lucent Enterprise (ALE) to China Huaxin Post & Telecommunication Economy Development Center.

In 2014, the Italian labs for the management system for terrestrial networks (1350 OMS) and two families of equipment for fiber optic telecommunications—OMSN (Optical Multi-Service Node) and TSS (Transport Service Switch)—were transferred to a new dedicated company, SM Optics, a subsidiary of the Siae Microelettronica group.

On 15 April 2015, Finnish telecommunications firm Nokia announced its intent to purchase Alcatel-Lucent for €15.6 billion in an all-stock deal. The acquisition aimed to create a stronger competitor to the rival firms Ericsson and Huawei, whom Nokia and Alcatel-Lucent had surpassed in terms of total combined revenue in 2014. The acquisition was expected to be completed in early 2016, and was subject to regulatory and shareholder approval. Combes left in September and was replaced by Philippe Camus (who had been chairman of the board since 2008) as interim CEO. Regulatory approval was obtained in October 2015 and shareholder approval was announced on 4 January 2016. The Bell Labs division would be maintained but the Alcatel-Lucent brand would be replaced by Nokia.

On 14 January 2016, Alcatel-Lucent started operating as part of the Nokia Group. The sale to Nokia was finalized in November and the company was merged into Nokia Networks.

Timeline

Alcatel
 1898 – French engineer Pierre Azaria sets up the Compagnie Générale d'Électricité (CGE).
 1919 – Aaron Weil creates the "Téléphone privé" (Private telephone)
 1925 – CGE becomes part of Compagnie Générale des Câbles de Lyon.  Bell Telephone Laboratories is created.
 1927 – The company is growing, and takes the name of "Téléphonie Industrielle et Commerciale" (TELIC)
 1928 – Alsthom is formed by Société Alsacienne de Constructions Mécaniques and Compagnie Française Thomson-Houston.
 1946 – The CIT is created (Compagnie Industrielle de Téléphone) with CGE (Compagnie Generale d'Electricité)
 1947 – ALSATEL is created. (Société Alsacienne et Lorraine de Télécommunication et d'Electronique) to enable sales expansion.
 1950 – See ITT Kellogg > ITT Telecommunications > Alcatel http://www.encyclopedia.chicagohistory.org/pages/2736.html
 1954 – TELIC acquires COFRATEL (Compagnie Française du Téléphone).
 1960 – TELIC delivers the complex Crossbar technology.
 1965 – CGE acquires TELIC, becoming a subsidiary of CIT.
 1970 – Alcatel is created by merging CIT and ENTE, a department of the SACM (Société Alsacienne de Constructions Mécaniques).
 1970 – Ambroise Roux becomes CGE's chairman. He then becomes the honorary chairman until his death in 1999.
 1977 – First PBX is created, controlled by an electronic CPU.
 1980 – Minitel is launched
 1982 – Jean-Pierre Brunet becomes CGE's chairman.
 1984 – Georges Pebereau becomes CGE's chairman. Thompson telecommunications is absorbed by CGE.  Cables de Lyon buys Thompson Jeumont Cables and Kabelmetal.
 1985 – Alsthom Atlantique becomes Alsthom. Alcatel is formed when CIT-Alcatel and Thompson telecommunications merge.
 1986 – ITT Corporation sells its European telecommunications business to CGE under its agreement with Alcatel NV. Cables de Lyon becomes a subsidiary of Alcatel NV. Pierre Suard becomes CGE Chairman.
 1987 – CGE is privatized. Alsthom wins contract for TGV Atlantique for the Northern TGV network.
 1989 – CGE and General Electric Company form GEC Alsthom. This allows Alsthom to sells its products outside France. CGEE-Alsthom becomes Cegelec. AT&T Technologies reorganizes with the following business units: Network systems, Global Business Communications, Microelectronics and Consumer Products.
 1991 – CGE changes its name to Alcatel Alsthom. Acquires Rockwell Technologies transmission equipment division. Cables de Lyons is renamed Alcatel Cable and takes over AEG Kabel.
 1991 – Alcatel acquires Telettra, an Italian Telecommunication systems company.
 1992 – Alcatel Alsthom acquires AEG Kabel.
 1993 – Alcatel Alsthom acquires STC Submarine systems from now Nortel Networks.
 1995 – Serge Tchuruk was appointed chairman and CEO of Alcatel Alsthom. He restructured the company to focus on telecommunications equipment.
 1998 – Alcatel Alsthom split.  Alsthom GEC becomes Alstom through an IPO (with Alcatel retaining 24%). Alcatel sells Cegelec to the newly formed Alstom.  Alcatel acquires DSC Communications for $4.4 billion and Packet Engines
 1999 – Alcatel acquires Xylan, Assured Access and Internet Devices. Alcatel increases its stake in Thomson CSF to 25.3% and decreases its stake in Framatome to 8.6%.
 2000 – Alcatel sells the DSL modem business to Thomson Multimedia and acquires Newbridge, Genesys and Innovative Fibers. Alcatel spins off its cable unit into Nexans. Lucent spins off Avaya Inc.
 2001 – Alcatel sells its stake in Alstom. Alcatel buys back Alcatel Space investment from Thales, and reduces its stake in Thales to 20.03%. Alcatel sells its 2.2% stake in Areva. Alcatel sells DSL modem business to Thomson Multimedia. Lucent spins off its microelectronics business into Agere Systems via an IPO.
 2002 – Alcatel acquires Astral Point Communications Inc., Telera Corporation, and control of Alcatel Shanghai Bell. Alcatel sells its microelectronic business to STMicroelectronics, its stake in Thomson, 10.3M shares of Thales, and 1.5M shares of Nexans.
 2003 – Alcatel acquires iMagicTV, and TiMetra Inc. It sells a 50% stake in Atlinks,  and its optical business to Avanex.
 2004 – Alcatel acquires eDial Inc. Alcatel and TCL form a joint venture: Alcatel Mobile Phones, with Alcatel holding a 45% stake. Alcatel and Draka Holdings form a joint venture: Draka Comteq B.V. with Alcatel holding a 49.9 stake. Alcatel finalizes its acquisition of Spatial Wireless but sells 7.1M shares of Avanex.
 2005 – Alcatel sells its 45% stake of the Alcatel Mobile Phones venture back to TCL.
 2006 – Alcatel & Lucent Technologies announce merger to become Alcatel-Lucent
 2014 – China Huaxin Post & Telecommunication Economy Development Center acquires Alcatel-Lucent Enterprise

AT&T, Lucent Technologies
 1869 – Elisha Gray and Enos N. Barton formed Western Electric Company.
 1927 – Bell Labs makes the first American long distance television transmission between New York and Washington DC.
 1937 – Clinton Davisson becomes the first of 11 Nobel Prize winners from Bell Labs for his experimental confirmation of the wave nature of electrons.
 1946 – Western Electric produces over 4 million telephones.
 1947 – Bell Labs invents the transistor. Bell Labs' Douglas H. Ring and W. Rae Young wrote a memo entitled Mobile Telephony – Wide Area Coverage – Case 20564, using "hexagonal" cells for radio frequency.
 1948 – Claude Shannon, of Bell Labs, publishes a paper on Information Theory.
 1954 – Bell Labs invents the solar cell battery.
 1956 – AT&T is involved in the efforts of TAT-1, the first submarine trans-Atlantic telephone cable, handling up to 36 channels. Electric repeaters, created by Bell Labs, were used. To settle an anti-trust lawsuit, Western Electric (formerly AT&T) sells off non-networking equipment business.
 1957 – Laser is invented at Bell Labs.
 1962 – Bell Labs builds and launches Telstar1, the first orbiting active communications satellite.
 1969 – Unix operating system is invented by Ken Thompson and Dennis Ritchie.
 1978 – Bell Labs conducts the first trial of a commercial cell phone service in Chicago.
 1980 – Bell Labs announces digital signal processor.
 1983 – AT&T installs the first high-capacity, long-haul lightwave transmission system between NYC and Washington DC.
 1996 – Lucent Technologies launches IPO, the largest at that time.
 1998 – Lucent purchases Jeong Kim's Yurie Systems for $1.1 billion.
 2000 – Richard McGinn, chairman and CEO, was replaced by former CEO Henry Schacht.
 2002 – Patricia Russo becomes Lucent's CEO.
 2003 – Patricia Russo becomes Lucent's Chairman.
 2004 – Lucent reports its first profitable year and revenue increase since 2000.
 2005 – Jeong Kim becomes Bell Labs 11th president.

Alcatel-Lucent
 2006 – Alcatel sells its satellite, railway signaling and critical security domain to Thales. On 3 December, Alcatel and Lucent merge to form Alcatel-Lucent.  Alcatel-Lucent acquires Nortel's UMTS radio access business.
 2007 – Alcatel-Lucent acquires Tropic Networks, NetDevices, Thompson Advisory Group, and Tamblin.
 2008 – Alcatel-Lucent acquires Motive Inc. Ben Verwaayen becomes Alcatel-Lucent's second CEO.
 2009 – Alcatel-Lucent sells its remaining share of Thales and outsources its IT to HP.
 2011 – Wim Sweldens leads a wireless group to develop lightRadio, a technology to reduce the size of cell towers to tiny cubes.
 2012 – Alcatel-Lucent sells Genesys Labs to Permira.
 2014 – 1 October, Alcatel-Lucent announces the spin-off of the Enterprise division to China Huaxin forming the standalone organization of Alcatel-Lucent Enterprise.
 2015 – Nokia Corporation announces its intentions to acquire Alcatel-Lucent for $16.6 billion.
 2016 – Nokia gains control of Alcatel-Lucent. As of 16 March Nokia held a 91.8 per cent stake in Alcatel-Lucent's total shares, and planned to complete the purchase of 100% by 26 April. The Alcatel-Lucent brand is abolished.

Organization
The company's global headquarters (now a Nokia office) was in Boulogne-Billancourt, France. It had previous head offices in the 7th arrondissement and 8th arrondissement of Paris, France. Its previous head office, in the 8th arrondissement, was built between 1912 and 1929 and was renovated in 1998. During the renovation, the building was decorated with materials on the theme of the cosmos and time.

There were regional groups for the Americas, Asia Pacific & China, and Europe, Middle East & Africa. Middle East and Africa Headquarters were at Smart Village, Giza, Egypt. Alcatel was present in Italy with various research centers: Vimercate (in Lombardy), Rieti, Battipaglia, Trieste, Genova, Bari, Naples, Rome and Sesto Fiorentino; by 2014, their presence was only in Vimercate, Trieste and Rome.

Board of directors
 Philippe Camus (Chairman)
 Michel Combes  (CEO)
 Stuart Eizenstat
 Louis Hughes
 Carla Cico
 Jean Monty
 Olivier Piou
 Jean-Cyril Spinetta
 Kim Crawford Goodman
 Véronique Morali
 Francesco Caio

Leadership
 Basil Alwan, IP routing & IP transport
 Bhaskar Gorti, Software
 David Geary, Wireless
 Sandy Motley, Fixed networks
 Federico Guillen, Operations
 Philippe Keryer, Strategy & Innovation
 Jean Raby, Chief Financial Officer
 Nicole Gionet, Human Resources
 Tim Krause, Chief Marketing Officer

Operating segments
The Core Networking segment included three business divisions: IP Routing, IP Transport and IP Platforms.
The Access segment included 4 business divisions: Wireless, Fixed Access, Licensing and Managed Services.

Research and development
Bell Labs was Alcatel-Lucent's research and development (R & D) organization.

In 1876, Alexander Graham Bell was awarded the first patent for the telephone, and subsequently started AT&T. Bell Labs is named in his honor.

In 1937, Clinton Davisson shared the Nobel Prize in Physics for demonstrating the wave nature of matter. His fundamental work is part of the foundation for much of today's solid-state electronics.

In 1947, John Bardeen, Walter Brattain, William Shockley of Bell Labs invented the transistor. In 1956, they received a Nobel Prize for their invention.  The transistor led to an electronics revolution during the post-war boom. The transition from vacuum tubes to transistors enabled all technologies to be built on a smaller scale and use less electricity. Items that before required large dedicated spaces, could now fit into a home or even on a kitchen counter.

In 1954, Gerald Pearson, Darryl Chapin and Calvin Fuller invented the solar cell. Telstar, the first active communications satellite also developed by Bell Labs and launched in 1962, used these solar cell batteries as an external renewable source of power once launched. It was the first to carry live television over water, between England and the US.

In the late 1950s, Charles Townes and Arthur Shawlow of Bell Labs invented the laser, which has numerous applications, including measuring/cutting in the manufacturing industry and research/surgery in the medical industry. Bell Labs was awarded the laser patent in 1960.

In 1964, Arno Allan Penzias and Robert Woodrow Wilson discovered the cosmic microwave background radiation. They were awarded the Nobel Prize in Physics in 1978.

In 1969, Dennis Ritchie and a team of Bell Labs employees invented the UNIX operating system and the C programming language.

In 2006, Willard S. Boyle and George E. Smith were awarded the National Academy of Engineering prize, for work on charge-coupled devices which transform patterns of light into useful digital information. In 2009, they received a Nobel Prize for their invention. The device is widely used in digital cameras, video cameras and modern astronomy.

In 2013, there was a Net R&D investment of €2.3 billion (approx. 16% of sales).
There are more than 32,000 active patents, more than 3,000 obtained in 2013, and 14,900 pending patent applications.

Awards and distinctions
 July 2013 – In a test conducted on the Villarceaux campus of Alcatel-Lucent in Nozay (near Paris), the Bell Labs researchers have successfully done Data Transmission from a speed of 31 terabits per second (T−bps) at a distance of 7,200 km, a capacity more than three times higher than the most advanced commercial submarine cables that exist today.

The investigators were able to obtain greater capacity ever obtained in underwater data transmission with a single fiber. This experiment was based on the pioneering work of Bell Labs in data channels in a single carrier of 200 gigabits per second (Gbit/s). As speeds and distances to such noise and signal distortion make recovery of the data a real challenge, the researchers used innovative detection techniques and applied a new set of technologies modulation, transmission and processing together with an advanced error correction coding.

 March 2012 – Alcatel-Lucent was selected by MIT's Technology Review to its 2012 TR50 List of the World's Most Innovative Companies. The magazine recognized Alcatel-Lucent lightRadio as a "key innovation".
 February–March 2012 – Alcatel-Lucent wins the Mobile World Congress Best Infrastructure Technology Award for the lightRadio Network.

Lawsuits

Violations of the U.S. Foreign Corrupt Practices Act
In December 2010, Alcatel-Lucent agreed to pay a total settlement of $137 million for bribing officials in Costa Rica, Honduras, Malaysia and Taiwan in violation of the U.S. Foreign Corrupt Practices Act (FCPA). The U.S. Securities and Exchange Commission (SEC) alleged that Alcatel retained consultants to funnel bribes of over $8 million to government officials in order to obtain and retain lucrative telecommunications contracts. Alcatel admitted that it made profits of approximately $48 million as a result of the bribes and was ordered to pay $45 million to settle charges with the SEC and a further $92 million to settle the criminal charges brought by the U.S. Department of Justice (DOJ).

Alcatel-Lucent v. Microsoft

Lucent Technologies filed suit against Gateway and Dell, claiming they had violated patents on MP3, MPEG and other technologies developed by Bell Labs, a division of predecessor company American Telephone & Telegraph. Microsoft voluntarily joined the lawsuit in April 2003, and Alcatel was added after it acquired Lucent.

The first part of the case involved two audio coding patents that Alcatel-Lucent claimed were infringed by Microsoft's Windows Media Player application. Alcatel-Lucent won the trial and $1.52 billion in damages, but the judge granted Microsoft's motion for judgment and new trial.  Alcatel-Lucent appealed.

In the second part of the case, the judge ruled that Microsoft had not violated Alcatel-Lucent's patents relating to speech recognition and the case was therefore dismissed before going to trial. Alcatel-Lucent intended to appeal.

The third part of the case, involving several user interface-related patents, began on 21 May 2013.

Additional patent infringement cases, some filed by Microsoft and some filed by Alcatel-Lucent, are pending in the United States.

Alcatel-Lucent v. Newegg and Overstock
In May 2013, Newegg and Overstock won a victory in United States circuit court in which an Alcatel-Lucent shopping cart patent was invalidated.

References

External links

 Official website, archived in January 2016

 
French companies established in 2006
Companies formerly listed on the New York Stock Exchange
Companies formerly listed on the Paris Bourse
Companies formerly listed on the Tokyo Stock Exchange
Nokia assets
Privatized companies of France
Spacecraft manufacturers
Telecommunications companies established in 2006
Telecommunications companies of France
Telecommunications equipment vendors
2016 mergers and acquisitions
Electronics companies of France
Mobile phone companies of France